Ann Gordon (or variants) may refer to:

Ann D. Gordon, American history research professor
Anne Gordon (born 1941), cricketer
Annerley Gordon (born 1967), also known as Ann Lee (singer), a British Electropop/Eurodance singer
Anna Adams Gordon (1853–1931), temperance movement leader
Ann Gordon McCrory (born 1956), First Lady of North Carolina

See also
Gordon (surname)